Wawayanda State Park is a   state park in Sussex County and Passaic County in northern New Jersey. The park is in Vernon Township on the Sussex side, and West Milford on the Passaic side. The park is operated and maintained by the New Jersey Division of Parks and Forestry. The hiking trails are maintained and updated by the New York - New Jersey Trail Conference.

The park is part of the Northeastern coastal forests ecoregion. It is home to the red-shouldered hawk, the barred owl and the great blue heron, and includes 1,300-foot (396 m) Wawayanda Mountain and glacially-formed, spring-fed Wawayanda Lake with a swimming beach and boat launch and group camping.

The  Bearfort Mountain Natural Area is a part of the park, with Terrace Pond at  near the top. The mountain forest includes swamp hardwood, hemlock and mixed hardwood and chestnut oak forest communities; some rock outcrops have a 360-degree view of the surrounding highlands.

 Wawayanda Swamp Natural Area is an Atlantic white cedar swamp with a mixed oak-hardwood forest and a lake and Laurel Pond.

 Wawayanda Hemlock Ravine Natural Area is a  ravine formed by Doublekill Creek surrounded by a hemlock and mixed hardwood forest. The Appalachian Trail is located on the western edge of the area.

See also

 List of New Jersey state parks
 New York - New Jersey Trail Conference

References

External links

 NJ Skylands Wawayanda Hiking Information and History and Geology
 USGS Wawayanda State Park Geology, Natural History
 The Wawayanda Iron Mine
 JORBA volunteer trail work information and maps for Wawayanda State Park

State parks of New Jersey
Parks in Passaic County, New Jersey
Parks in Sussex County, New Jersey
IUCN Category V
Vernon Township, New Jersey
West Milford, New Jersey